John Madden Football '92, released as Pro Football in Japan, is a football video game released by Electronic Arts in 1991. It was the second Madden title released for the Sega Genesis, following the original John Madden Football from the previous year, starting the tradition of annual installments.

New aspects of this version include instant replay, two-player cooperative play, quarterback injuries, highlights, and more audibles. There are also new play modes, such as pre-season games, regular season games, playoffs, and sudden death, which was a way to simulate overtime in NFL games. Quarter lengths have been adjusted in this version to be set at 5, 10, or 15 minutes. As in previous versions of the video game, there are no NFL or NFLPA licenses for authentic teams, player names, and stadia. Teams are organized by city name and colors.

MegaTech gave the game 95% and a Hyper Game Award, saying that "you'll enjoy it, even if you don't care much for the sport". In October 1992, Mega placed the game at #1 in their Top Mega Drive Games of All Time.

References

External links

Madden NFL
1991 video games
Electronic Arts games
Sega Genesis games
Sega Genesis-only games
EA Sports games
Video games developed in the United States